Tulum is the largest community in the municipality of Tulum, Quintana Roo, Mexico. It is located on the Caribbean coast of the state, near the site of the archaeological ruins of Tulum.

History
As recently as the early 1990s, Tulum  was a quiet village 2 km (1.5 mi) from the archaeological site, and tourism outside of the ruins was limited to a few small shops and simple cabañas on the beach. As of the 2020 census, population of Tulum municipality has grown to 46,721 permanent inhabitants with the addition of a number of residential developments in the jungle areas nearest Tulum's downtown. With the rapid increase in tourism, vacation rentals, small hotels and hostels, as well as restaurants and bars the town is getting more and more popular. Grocery stores, boutiques, bicycle rentals, gyms, tour operators, banks, ATMs, internet cafes, and various other commercial stores are available in Tulum town. Spanish Language Schools are popular in Tulum, including Meztli Spanish Language School and Jardin Espanol.

Since 13 March 2008, the town is head of the newly founded municipality (município), the ninth in Quintana Roo.

Zona Hotelera Tulum 
Two kilometers from the town center, the "hotel zone" of boutique hotels and restaurants on the Tulum beach has grown to over 70 hotels. Most of them are cabañas built in the traditional Maya style with thatched palm roofs though there are some more high end hotels as well. There are many new restaurants, particularly on the jungle side of the road, some of which have received significant praise in the international press. There are also a few beach clubs and public beaches. Due to the increasing popularity of the place, the inexpensive cabañas with hammocks that could be rented some years ago are not available anymore, the prices now have gone very high, especially on the "hotel zone". Most accommodations remain rustic-style, but electricity in the "hotel zone" arrived in 2020 with most of the hotels and main restaurants now making use of it.

Tulum International Airport

In March 2011, the bidding for construction contracts was to be concluded.

As of April 2014, all projects related with the Tulum Airport were no longer available through official sites, and after the installation of Andrés Manuel López Obrador as president in 2018, emphasis was placed on the high speed trans-peninsula train, the Tren Maya.

In recent years plans were reinstituted and the airport is scheduled to open in 2023. However, there has been no official start day on the construction or confirmation of the project from the government as of yet.

References

External links

Municipio de Tulum Official website of Municipality of Tulum

Populated places in Quintana Roo
Tulum (municipality)